Israeli casualties of war, in addition to those of Israel's nine major wars, include 9,745 soldiers and security forces personnel killed in "miscellaneous engagements and terrorist attacks", which includes security forces members killed during military operations, by fighting crime, natural disasters, diseases, traffic or labor accidents and disabled veterans whose disabilities contributed to their deaths. Between 1948 and 1997, 20,093 Israeli soldiers were killed in combat, 75,000 Israelis were wounded, and nearly 100,000 Israelis were considered disabled army veterans. On the other hand, in 2010 Yom Hazikaron, Israel honored the memory of 22,684 Israeli soldiers and pre-Israeli Palestinian Jews killed since 1860 in the line of duty for the independence, preservation and protection of the nation, and 3,971 civilian terror victims. The memorial roll, in addition to IDF members deceased, also include fallen members of the Shin Bet security service, the Mossad intelligence service, the Israel Police, the Border Police, the Israel Prisons Service, other Israeli security forces, the pre-state Jewish underground, and the Jewish Brigade and the Jewish Legion (which served alongside British forces in World War II and World War I respectively).

According to the Israeli Ministry of Foreign Affairs and the Anti-Defamation League, a total of 1,194 Israelis and foreigners were killed and 7,000 wounded between September 2000 and August 2010 by Palestinian terror attacks (most of them during 2000–2005 Second Intifada); while more than 3,000 Israelis have been killed and 25,000 have been wounded as a result of Palestinian violence and hostile enemy action (without including wars) since the establishment of the state of Israel in 1948 until today. Another 685 Jewish residents of Mandatory Palestine were killed between 1920 and 1947 as a result of Arab riots, British anti-Zionist operations and World War II attacks. Palestinians killed 1,074 Israelis and wounded 7,520 between 2000 and 2005.

The following tables summarize Israeli casualties by war, conflict or incident.

Prior to Israel's independence

Conflicts with Arabs

Sinking of ships carrying Jewish immigrants
In the White Paper of 1939 the British government limited Jewish immigration to Palestine to 75,000 over the following five years. European Jews were anxious for ways to leave Europe, but for the most part there were few options. No countries were willing to take Jewish immigrants. However, some Eastern European states were willing to give transit visas. During World War II, many countries denied or severely limited Jewish refugees fleeing the Holocaust, and Palestine was one of the few destinations available.

In post-Holocaust Europe, the 1,000,000 Jewish survivors were classified as "non-repatrifiable" by the Austrian and German government. In other words, Jews were not "officially allowed to leave the countries of Central and East Europe" by the allied powers, nor were they permitted to settle in Palestine by the British.

An unknown number of Jewish refugees perished en route from European ports to Palestine, and over 30,000 holocaust survivors who successfully immigrated were interned by the British in POW camps. Many immigrant ships were sunk during the British blockade.

Note: Graph is not comprehensive

Regular conflicts
Bold indicates conflicts considered wars by the Israeli Ministry of Defense (as they were named by Israel):

Terror and other attacks 1948-1967

Terror and other attacks 1968–1987

Note: Table is not comprehensive

Attacks against Israeli diplomatic missions

Suicide Bombings

From 1993 to 2003, 303 Palestinian suicide bombers attacked Israel. More than 80% of all suicide bombings occurred after the year 2000. 55% of all suicide attacks were deemed "successful" – that is, resulted in killing themselves and injuring or killing others. Suicide bombings constituted just 0.5% of Palestinian attacks against Israelis in the first two years of the Second Intifada, though this percentage accounted for half of the Israelis killed in that period.

Between 2000 and 2006, 521 suicide bombing plots were thwarted by the Israeli Defense Forces and 540 Israelis were killed by suicide bombings.

Non-combat military casualties
171 Israeli soldiers have been killed in training exercises and non-combat roles since 1977.

Wars ranked by total deaths

1948 Arab–Israeli War
Yom Kippur War
War of Attrition
Six-Day War
1982 Lebanon War
Suez Crisis
2006 Lebanon War

Gallery of memorials

Gallery

See also
Palestinian political violence
Timeline of the Israeli-Palestinian conflict
List of attacks against Israeli civilians before 1967
List of Israeli civilian casualties in the Second Intifada
Violence against Israelis in the Israeli–Palestinian conflict 2001
Violence in the Israeli–Palestinian conflict 2002
Violence in the Israeli–Palestinian conflict 2003
Violence in the Israeli–Palestinian conflict 2004
Violence in the Israeli–Palestinian conflict 2005
Violence in the Israeli–Palestinian conflict 2006
Violence in the Israeli–Palestinian conflict 2007
Violence in the Israeli–Palestinian conflict 2008
List of violent incidents in the Israeli–Palestinian conflict, 2011
Yom Hazikaron
Palestinian casualties of war

References

Military history of Israel